The Hungarian Fencing Championships are an annual outdoor fencing competition organized and supervised by the Hungarian Fencing Federation, which serves as the Hungarian national championships for the sport.

Champions

Foil

Notes

Statistics

Men's
Overall

External links
Official website of the Hungarian Fencing Federation 

 
Recurring sporting events established in 1900
1900 establishments in Hungary